Trimmer may refer to:

 Trimmer (construction), beam used in construction
 Trimmer (electronics), small electrical component
 Trimmer (gardening), gardening power tool
 Trimmer (surname)
 Trimmer, California, community in Fresno County
 Laminate trimmer, wood-working tool
 Trimmer - a book trimming machine
 Coal trimmer, also known as a trimmer, a person who distributes coal on a steam ship 
 Hair clipper
 George Savile, 1st Marquess of Halifax, author of The Character of a Trimmer, which was and is often held to describe his own conduct - and therefore he has "the Trimmer" as a nickname

See also
 
 
 Trimer (disambiguation)
 Trim (disambiguation)